Khinjan District (pop: 29,600)  is located in the southern part of Baghlan province in the Hindu Kush mountains. The capital is the town of Khenjan. The main Kabul-Kunduz highway passes through the district from south to west. Ethnic Tajiks makes up around 85% of the total population while the Pashtuns, Hazara and Uzbeks, each at 5%, makes up the remaining 15% of the population.

See also 
 Districts of Afghanistan
 Baghlan Province

References

External links 
 Map
 District profile by the UNHCR (9 April 2002)

Districts of Baghlan Province